Debbie Reese is a Nambé Pueblo scholar and educator. Reese founded American Indians in Children's Literature, which analyzes representations of Native and Indigenous peoples in children's literature. She co-edited a young adult adaptation of An Indigenous Peoples' History of the United States with Jean Mendoza in 2019.

Early life and education 
Reese was raised on a reservation in New Mexico and is a tribally enrolled member of the Nambé Pueblo nation. 

She received her doctoral degree in education from University of Illinois at Urbana-Champaign. She later received her MLIS from San Jose State University through a grant that funded 20 Native students to complete the degree.

Career 
Prior to obtaining her PhD, she was a school teacher and taught at two American elementary schools, and at two schools for Native Americans: Riverside Indian School in Anadarko, Oklahoma, and Santa Fe Indian School in Santa Fe, New Mexico. She previously taught at University of Illinois at Chicago. 

In 2006, Reese founded American Indians in Children's Literature (AICL), an organization and website that offers critical analysis of Native and Indigenous peoples in children's literature. She frequently discusses the inaccuracy of depictions of Natives in classic American children's literature like Peter Pan and Little House on the Prairie series, and suggests that they lead readers to believe that Natives are no longer present.  

Reese advocates for teachers and parents to select books written for and by Native Americans as the best way to engage their narratives. She has repeatedly spoken against the publication of Native stories by white writers from the "big five" publishers. Reese was one of several writers who spoke out against the publication of children's book A Birthday Cake for George Washington and used AICL to track the publisher's response to the campaign.

In 2019, she and Jean Mendoza co-wrote An Indigenous Peoples' History of the United States for Young People, based on An Indigenous Peoples' History of the United States. The book was named a 2020 American Indian Youth Literature Young Adult Honor Book.

Personal life 
Reese resides in New Mexico. She is married and has one daughter.

Works

Accolades 
 2018 - May Hill Arbuthnot Honor Lecture Award, American Library Association

For An Indigenous Peoples' History of the United States for Young People: 

 Best YA Nonfiction of 2019, Kirkus Reviews

 Best Nonfiction of 2019, School Library Journal
 2020 American Indian Youth Literature Award for Young Adult Honor Book
 2020 In the Margins Award

References

External links 
 Official Twitter
 American Indians in Children's Literature

Year of birth missing (living people)
Living people
Native American academics
Native American women writers
21st-century Native American women
21st-century Native Americans
Indigenous peoples in the United States
University of Illinois College of Education alumni
San Jose State University alumni
20th-century Native American women
20th-century Native Americans
American librarians of Native descent